Dr Manmohan Singh Scholarships are available for any students for doctoral study at St John's College at the University of Cambridge and for undergraduate studies at the university. The Scholarships are named in honor of Manmohan Singh, a former Prime Minister of India and a renowned economist. Singh graduated from St John's College with a First in Economics in 1957, went on to earn a DPhil from the University of Oxford in 1962, and was awarded an honorary doctorate by the University of Cambridge in 2006.

Dr Manmohan Singh Scholarships for Doctoral Studies
The idea for this award was suggested by Ab Banerjee who is a former Johnian. Banerjee also worked on this plan and attended a few dinners with Manmohan Singh.

These are PhD standard scholarships for prospective Indian PhD students awarded by the college. The award was designed to benefit academically bright Indian students and is administered by the College.

The scholarship programme has been funded by BP, Rolls-Royce, Hardeep Rai (a St John's College alumnus) and two anonymous sponsors.

The awards are for study towards doctoral degrees in the following subjects:

Science & Technology
Economics
Social Sciences
Aerospace Engineering
Marine Engineering
Energy Studies

PhD Award Eligibility Criteria

The applicant should be:

An Indian national with a valid Indian passport
Below 35 years of age before 31 January in year of application
Holding a Master's (postgraduate) degree from a reputed/recognized Indian university/institution with a First Class award (UG and PG) in the relevant subject/field
Evidence of leadership qualities
Fluent in spoken and written English
Able to fulfill any other admission criteria laid down by the university

PhD Award Value

The scholarships award value areas are:

Academic fees
International airfare
Monthly stipend to cover living expenses
UK Visa

PhD Award Winners

The first time awardees (October 2008) in this scholarship's history are:

Niladri Banerjee
Manasa Patnam
Nitu Duggal

The second time awardees (October 2009) of scholarship are:

Aquila Mukund Mavalankar
Shruti Badhwar

The third time awardees (October 2010) of scholarship are:

Mahak
Karthik Depuru
Aditi Borkar
Utham Kashyap Valekunja

The fourth time awardees (October 2011) of scholarship are
Shashi Ratnaker Singh (a research fellow at TERI) 
 Avishek Ranjan (a master's degree holder from IIT Chennai)
 Arjun Datta (a fellow MTech from IIT Roorkee)
 Sohini Vanjari (a master's degree holder in zoology from Pune University)

The fifth time awardees (September 2012) of scholarship are
 Parama Ghoshal (assistant professor of chemical engineering at Jadavpur University, Kolkata)
 Nishit Srivastava (MS in engineering from the Jawarharlal Nehru Centre for Advanced Scientific Research, Bangalore)
 Sudhir Rama Murthy (research associate with the Centre for Sustainable Technologies at the Indian Institute of Science, Bangalore)

The sixth time awardees were declared in August 2013.
 Rishika Kundra, MSc, Biomedical Science from Dr. B.R. Ambedkar Centre for Biomedical Research with specialisation in psoriatic arthritis
 Kedar Pandya, MTech, Aerospace Engineering from IIT Bombay, focusing on ballistic impact behaviour of carbon nanotube (CNT) and nanoparticle dispersed resins and composites.

The seventh time awardee was declared in May 2014. 
 Rohit Chikkaraddy (BS-MS Dual degree from Indian Institute of Science Education and Research, Pune)

The eighth time awardee was declared in June 2015. 
 Arya Thampi (BS-MS Dual degree from Indian Institute of Science Education and Research, Pune)
The ninth time awardee was declared in June 2016.
 Swastika Issar (Research fellow at National Centre for Biological Sciences-Tata Institute of Fundamental Research, Bangalore)

The Tenth time awardee was declared in June 2017.
 Karthick Murukesan (MTech in Electrical Engineering specialising in microelectronics from IIT Bombay).

Manmohan Singh Undergraduate Scholarships 
This scholarship is available to Indian undergraduate applicants in any subject.

Undergraduate Award Conditions 
Applicants must be school-leavers from India, applying for the BA (not BAaff), and must require financial assistance in order to study at the University of Cambridge.

Undergraduate Award Value 
The value of this scholarship will depend on the level of financial need of the applicant, and scholarship funds available. It is a merit scholarship covering all the tuition and College fees.

Undergraduate Award Winners 
The first time awardees (2010) in this scholarship's history are:

Rudrajit Banerjee, The Cambridge School, Kolkata
Neal Duggal, Mallya Aditi International School, Bangalore
Jesika Haria, Dhirubhai Ambani International School, Mumbai

The second time awardees (2011) of scholarship are:

Rishabh Bhargava, Seth Anandram Jaipuria School, Kanpur
Neil Satra, Dhirubhai Ambani International School, Mumbai 
Payoshaa Shah, Utpal Shanghvi School, Mumbai

The third time awardees (2012) of scholarship are:
Devang Agrawal, Florets International School, Kanpur
Gaurav Kumar, DPS International, New Delhi
Mayukh Ketan Mukhopadhyay, Calcutta International School, Kolkata
The fourth time awardees (2013) of scholarship are:
Siddhant Jayakumar, Dhirubhai Ambani International School, Mumbai  
 Nisarg Mehta, Dhirubhai Ambani International School, Mumbai
The fifth time awardees (2014) of scholarship are
Ritu Muralidharan, Dhirubhai Ambani International School, Mumbai
Rohit Chikkareddy, Indian Institute of Science Education & Research, Pune

See also
Gates Cambridge Scholarship
St John's College, Cambridge
Dr. Manmohan Singh
List of awards and honours received by Manmohan Singh

References

External links
The British council The Dr Manmohan Singh Scholarships
Article on Dr Manmohan Singh Scholarships
Article 2 on Dr Manmohan Singh Scholarships
Article 3 on Dr Manmohan Singh Scholarships

Admissionguru scholarship for study in india and abroad

Awards and prizes of the University of Cambridge
St John's College, Cambridge
Scholarships in the United Kingdom
Manmohan Singh